The 1990 Florida State Seminoles football team represented Florida State University in the 1990 NCAA Division I-A football season. The team was coached by Bobby Bowden and played their home games at Doak Campbell Stadium.

Schedule

Roster

Rankings

Season summary

Miami (FL)

Auburn

LSU

Bobby Bowden's 200th win

Florida

vs. Penn State (Blockbuster Bowl)

References

Florida State
Florida State Seminoles football seasons
Cheez-It Bowl champion seasons
Florida State Seminoles football